Maroco sakin is a racist Hebrew language term used in Israel that means "Moroccan knife". The term refers to a stereotype that Moroccan Jews carried knives on their persons and were prone to violent criminality and nervousness. The stereotype of Maroka’i sakina’i (Moroccans with knives) was most commonly leveled against young working-class Moroccan male immigrants. The term was most often used by Israeli Jews of European descent, particularly Ashkenazi Jews, against Moroccan Jews specifically and sometimes North African Mizrahi Jews more broadly. The term is dated, largely being used during the height of Moroccan-Jewish immigration between the 1950s and the 1970s.

The leftist Ashkenazi Israeli writer Gideon Levy has referred to "Moroccans with knives" as a term of dehumanization, claiming that historical prejudice against Moroccan Jews is connected to current anti-Arab racism in Israel.

See also
Ars (slang)
Racism in Jewish communities
Racism in Israel

References

Anti-Arabism in Israel
Class-related slurs
Crime in Israel
Ethnic and racial stereotypes
Hebrew slang
Mizrahi Jewish culture in Israel
Moroccan-Jewish culture in Israel
Ethnic and religious slurs
Racism in Israel
Slang terms for men
Stereotypes of Arab people
Stereotypes of Jewish people
Stereotypes of working-class men
Violent crime
Working class in Asia